Sarah A. Simmons (formerly Hutz) is a Democratic former member of the New Hampshire House of Representatives, representing Dover, New Hampshire in Strafford County's 5th District for two terms from 2006–2010.

External links
New Hampshire House of Representatives - Sarah Hutz official NH House website
Project Vote Smart - Representative Sarah Hutz (NH) profile
Follow the Money - Sarah Hutz
2006 campaign contributions

Members of the New Hampshire House of Representatives
1979 births
Living people
Women state legislators in New Hampshire
21st-century American women